The Farnam Mansion is a 19th-century mansion in Oneida, New York, United States. Built circa 1862, it is situated on the southwest corner of Main and Stone Streets within the city's Main-Broad-Grove Streets Historic District, which was listed on the National Register of Historic Places in 1983.

Architecture

Constructed in the Italianate style, the mansion's exterior features a low-pitched roof, projecting eaves supported by large decorative cornice brackets, tall windows with ornate pediments, bay windows at the north and south sides of the house, and a wrap-around porch at the north and east sides. A square belvedere is situated above the east side of the mansion. It has a mansard roof and a trio of arched windows on all four sides. The front entry of the mansion features a pair of arched mahogany doors with windows, hand-carved panels, and rare ornamental bronze doorknobs made by the Metallic Compression Company of Boston, which feature a highly stylized dog's face and paws. The mansion's interior features eleven-foot high ceilings, ornate plaster ceiling medallions and crown mouldings, tall paneled tiger-oak doors, and two sets of paneled tiger-oak pocket doors. Three of the first floor rooms each contain a marble fireplace. The main parlor retains its original cut-crystal gasolier, which has never been converted to electricity, and an ornate pier mirror on a marble top base. A staircase leads to the second floor where there are four bedrooms, five bathrooms, a small library, nursery, and servant's quarters.

A black and white photograph (circa 1970s) showing the front of the Farnam Mansion appears on page 11 of the 1976 book, Country Roads - Madison County's Heritage: A Resource for the Future (Madison County Planning Board; Jennifer G.F. Solms and Paula A. Schoonmaker, editors). The photo's caption, which refers to the mansion as the "Farnam House" states that the builders "probably copied their design from the popular pattern books which published plans for the latest architectural styles." An uncaptioned black and white drawing of the mansion appears on page 8, and a paragraph describing some of the architectural details of "Oneida's Farnam House" appears on pages 130 and 131 in the Madison County Architecture section (by Brooks Stoddard.) An excerpt from the paragraph states that the mansion "features a tower topped by overhanging cornices 
supported by ornate brackets. Similarly, the windows are decorated with very heavy hood-moulds and cornices, details which add considerable richness to the building. Wrought iron designs of vines and flowers further enhance this effect." Stoddard also calls the mansion a prime example of the county's Italian Villa style of architecture which began circa 1850 as part of the Alexander Jackson Davis and Andrew Jackson Downing innovations.

History

The original owner of the mansion was a wealthy businessman named Stephen Head Farnam, after whom the house was named. In addition to being a successful hardware store owner  and president of the National State Bank, Mr. Farnam was also a proprietor of the Little Falls Axe Factory, the president of the Glenwood Cemetery Association, and one of the organizers and first directors of the Oneida Gas Light Company. He died at home on November 17, 1897, after suffering a stroke. His obituary described him as "a well-known and highly esteemed citizen and merchant" of Oneida, and also "a self-made man and the architect of his own fortunes." (Other members of the Farnam family who have died in the mansion include Stephen's first wife, Elizabeth; their son Frederick James, who died of consumption in 1892 at the age of thirty-one; and Stephen's sister Sarah Robinson, who died after a week's illness of dysentery at the age of 80.)

In October 1913 Stephen Farnam's widowed second wife, Sarah, sold the mansion to Mary Dyer Jackson, an early activist in the women's suffrage movement. Miss Jackson, who founded the Progress Club in 1889 and became a charter member of the Madison County Historical Society in 1898, was well known on a regional scale for being the first woman in Central New York to circulate a petition asking the New York State Legislature to grant women the right to vote. Just five months after purchasing the mansion, Jackson sold the property and moved out. Her unusual short stay, along with the Farnam deaths, ignited a rumor that the mansion was haunted. As the rumor spread, many people in Oneida became convinced that frightful encounters with spirits were responsible for Jackson's hasty departure.

In March 1914, Dr. Robert Lewis Crockett and his wife Mabel took ownership of the mansion. Dr. Crockett was a distinguished physician and surgeon who served as the 8th mayor of Oneida from 1916 to 1917 before leaving for military service in the first World War. He was also a naturalist who made a hobby of collecting wild plants and flower specimens, and was a member of three noted Syracuse University expeditions into Mexico, South America, and Canada. One of his favorite pastimes was taking field trips to the wilds of the Adirondacks to seek unusual plant specimens, many of which he brought back with him and studied in a laboratory set up in the basement of his home. It was down in this laboratory, while examining botanical specimens with his wife, that he was stricken with a fatal heart attack on May 27, 1946. His widow sold the mansion to Dr. Chancellor H. Whiting in 1952, who, in turn, sold it ten years later to Dr. William M. Hummer and his wife Shirley - both of whom died in the house in the 1980s.

The mansion was converted into a bed and breakfast by its next owners, the Chapins, who added four bathrooms and two rooms with Jacuzzi tubs to the bedrooms on the second floor. They lived in the house for eleven years until ill health forced them to retire from innkeeping. They sold the mansion to Todd Gioeli and his wife, who used it as a single-family rental property for a number of years. In 2010 the house changed hands again with Gerri Gray as the new owner.

Deaths in the Farnam Mansion

Current use

The Farnam Mansion is currently owned by writer and former antique dealer Gerri Gray, who, along with her husband Brian, have painstakingly worked to renovate and restore the house to its former glory. Recent renovations to the mansion include a new back porch constructed in July 2014, a complete remodel of the first floor bathroom in January 2016, and exterior brick replacement on the front of the house in July 2016.

In 2010 they opened their doors to the public as a bed and breakfast called the Collinwood Inn. Themed after the 1960s gothic daytime drama, Dark Shadows, and decorated with antiques and various Dark Shadows memorabilia, the inn offered guests the choice of four rooms named after the television show's main characters: Barnabas, Angelique, Josette, and Quentin. In 2013 the bed and breakfast ceased operation, and all public events and guided tours of the mansion were discontinued. The house is now used as a single family dwelling, and the Grays occasionally host private paranormal investigations and seances there.

Hauntings

After experiencing a number of strange and unexplainable phenomena in the Farnam Mansion and learning of the alleged paranormal experiences of some of its former owners and residents, Gerri and Brian Gray contacted a paranormal research group called the New York Shadow Chasers and invited them to investigate the house. The first of many paranormal investigations of the Farnam Mansion by the Shadow Chasers team took place in April 2011 on Good Friday. During that initial investigation, paranormal activity was witnessed and documented by all of the investigators and included the sighting of a shadow figure darting along the exterior wall in the main parlor, a lamp in the parlor turning on by itself, unexplained footsteps and voices coming from the bedroom directly above the parlor, a light anomaly on the second floor, and numerous intelligent responses via a PX device and voice recorders, which were believed to be spirit communications.  The New York Shadow Chasers concluded that "it was clear before we even began putting away the equipment that the Farnam Mansion was haunted and the spirits were very happy to communicate."

On August 13, 2011, the Farnam Mansion hosted its first annual "Night of Shadows" public paranormal investigation with the New York Shadow Chasers to help educate the public about ghost-hunting as well as the history of the house. The investigators and participants alike documented paranormal activity which included the sounds of footsteps, disembodied voices and shadow figures. At midnight a seance conducted by Gerri Gray was held in the seance room and the paranormal activity in the mansion increased to the point of heavy footsteps pacing the halls and the materialization of a white phantom cat on the attic stairs.

Numerous paranormal investigations (both public and private) have since been conducted at the Farnam Mansion, which has quickly earned itself the reputation of being a "paranormal hot spot.". Groups and individuals that have investigated the mansion include the New York Shadow Chasers, New York State Paranormal Research, psychic-medium Lesley Marden, author and radio show host Ron Kolek, Anne Kerrigan of East Bridgewater's Most Haunted, the New England Ghost Project, Michelle Desrochers of Canada's Most Haunted, Island Paranormal, and Rome Investigators of the Paranormal (R.I.P.).

The Farnam Mansion, along with its history and paranormal activity, are featured in the books, Ghost Hunting the Mohawk Valley by Lynda Lee Macken, Cano Davy and Marcus Zwierecki (Black Cat Press, 2012) and Chasing Shadows: New York Ghosts by Katya Von Heuser and P.W. Creighton (CreateSpace Independent Publishing Platform, 2012). The mansion also appeared on the front cover of the October 2017 issue of Accent (an Observer-Dispatch media publication.) The same magazine additionally featured a three-page, photo-illustrated story about the hauntings of the Farnam Mansion, which was written by Tennille-Lynn Millo.

References

External links
 Madison County, NY, Biographies 1899
 Inside the Haunted Farnam Mansion in Oneida - Haunts and Legends of New York Episode 20

Reportedly haunted locations in New York (state)
Houses completed in 1862
Houses in Madison County, New York
Italianate architecture in New York (state)
Historic district contributing properties in New York (state)
1862 establishments in New York (state)
National Register of Historic Places in Madison County, New York